The Bamileke languages are a group of Eastern Grassfields languages spoken by the Bamileke people in the Western High Plateau of Cameroon.

The languages, which might constitute two branches of Eastern Grassfields, are:
Western Bamileke: Mengaka (Məgaka), Ngombale, Ngomba (Nguemba or Ngemba)Archived at Ghostarchive and the Wayback Machine: , the "Bamboutos" dialect cluster of Yɛmba, Ngyɛmbɔɔŋ, Mmuock and Ŋwe
Eastern Bamileke: Fe'fe', Ghɔmálá', Kwa', Nda'nda', Mədʉmba.

References

External links
Bamileke Culture (in french)
PanAfriL10n page on Bamileke
Langue Nguemba Ouest Cameroun Leçon 1 (in french)
APPRENTISSAGE DE LA LANGUE NGUEMBA " langue parle à Bansoa" (in french)

 
Languages of Cameroon
Eastern Grassfields languages
Bamileke people